The aims of the Football Australia Hall of Fame are to celebrate and highlight the achievements of retired players and other participants who have contributed significantly to the game. These are made up of either Australian and/or non-Australian players, managers and other participants who have become significant figures in the history of the game in Australia. It was first established as the Soccer Hall of Fame in 1999. New members are generally added each year.

Selection
All nominees must be Australian citizens. For non-players, inclusion is based on criteria including and "overall sustained contribution to the game".

Awards
Originally, there were several categories based on the nature of an individual's contribution, including:
 Hall of Champions (players) / Hall of Honour (non-players)
 Medal of Excellence (players) / Roll of Honour (non-players)
 Award of Distinction (players) / Roll of Honour (non-players)

1999 Inaugural inductees

Players

  George Smith
  Cliff Sander
  Graham McMillan
  John Perin
  Frank Parsons
  Jeff Olver
  Gordon Nunn
  Sergio Melta
  Gary Marocchi
  Alan Johns
  Tom Jack
  William "Bill" Henderson
  Jack Evans
  Sjel "Mike" de Bruyckere
  William Coolahan
  Jim Armstrong
  Ron Adair
  John Watkiss
  Ray Richards
  Graham Jennings
  Col Curran
  Charlie Yankos
  Connie Selby
  Harry Williams
  Manfred Schaefer
  John Nyskohus
  James McNabb
  William Maunder
  Jimmy Mackay
  Frank Loughran
  Bob Lawrie
  Julie Dolan
  Ray Baartz
  Peter Wilson
  Johnny Warren MBE
  Jimmy Rooney
  Alf Quill
  James "Judy" Masters
  Joe Marston MBE
  Ron Lord
  John Kosmina
  Reg Date
  Bob Bignell
  Attila Abonyi

Participants

  Ron Wright
  Sir William Walkley
  Joe Vlasits
  William Thomas
  Ron Smith
  Martin Royal
  Peter Nikolich
  Des Miles
  Frank McIver
  Zoran Matić
  Jack Logan
  Brian Lefevre
  Tony Kovac OAM
  Tom Grimson
  Keith Gilmour
  Pam Gilbert
  Harry Croft
  Donald Campbell
  Fred Barlow
  Eric Worthington
  Laurie Schwab
  Les Scheinflug
  Julius Re
  Sam Papasavas
  Dieter Klose
  Brian Corrigan
  Ian Brusasco AM
  Giacomo "Jim" Bayutti OA
  Frank Arok
  Michael Weinstein AM, BEM
  Elaine Watson OAM
  Vic Tuting MBE
  Robert Telfer
  Rale Rasic
  Theo Maramaris MBE
  Arthur Gibbs
  John Walter Fletcher
  Harry Dockerty
  Tony Boscovic
  Sir Arthur George AO

2000 inductees

Players

  Adrian Alston
  Eddie Krncevic
  Paul Wade
  Oscar Crino
  Doug Utjesenovic
  Murray Barnes
  Ron Corry
  Alex Gibb
  Kevin O'Neill
  Joe Watson

Participants

  Chris Bambridge
  Don Sutherland
  Charles Valentine
  Barry Bainbridge
  Jim Connell
  Charles Perkins
  Emmanuel Poulakakis
  John Taylor

2001 inductees

Players

  Bill Vojtek
  Cecil Drummond
  Alan Davidson
  Frank Farina
  Tony Henderson
  Pat O'Connor
  David Ratcliffe
  Jim Tansey
  Leo Baumgartner
  Gary Byrne
  Robert Dunne
  Ken Murphy

Participants

  John Constantine
  Basil Scarsella
  Charles Caruso
  Doug Rennie
  Bill Vrolyks
  George Wallace
  Les Broadbent
  Sid Grant
  Eric Heath
  Bob McShane
  Arthur Roberts
  Bill Turner

2002 inductees

Players

  James Wilkinson
  Cindy Heydon
  George Harris
  Branko Buljevic
  Stan Ackerley
  Peter Ollerton
  Joanne Millman
  Norman Conquest

Participants

  Fred Robins
  Eddie Thomson
  George Vasilopoulos
  Allan Crisp
  John Fraser
  Siri Kannangara
  Dennis McDermott
  Rodney Woods

2003 inductees

Players

  Wally Savor
  Percy Lennard
  William "Bill" Henderson
  Milan Ivanović
  Colin Bennett
  Gary Cole
  Steve O'Connor
  Roy Crowhurst
  Theresa Deas
  David Harding

Participants

  Betty Hoar
  Les Murray
  Peter Gray
  Ken Allen
  Vito Cilauro
  Denis Harlow
  Joseph Honeysett
  Peter Van Ryn

2004 inductees

Players

  Graham Arnold
  Jack Hughes
  Jack Reilly
  Todd Clarke
  Ian Gray
  Sue Monteath

Participants

  Peter Thorne
  Jane Oakley
  Roy Druery
  Gordon Dunster
  Fred Hutchinson

2005 inductees

Players

  Mike Petersen
  Robbie Slater
  Allan Maher
  Alec Cameron
  Craig Johnston
  Bruce Morrow

Participants

  Roger Lamb
  Vic Dalgleish
  Harry Hetherington
  Phil Murphy
  Gary Wilkins

2006 inductees

Players

  Dave Mitchell
  Charlie Stewart
  Peter Sharne
  Ernie Campbell
  Robert Zabica

Participants

  Fred Villiers
  Raul Blanco
  André Krüger
  Ray Sandell

2007 inductees

Players

  Alex Tobin
  Terry Greedy
  Steve Blair
  Anissa Tann

Participants

  Eddie Lennie
  Heather Reid
  John Barclay
  Ted Rowley
  Trixie Tagg

2008 inductees

Players

  Tracey Wheeler
  George Keith
  Cliff Almond
  Julie Murray
  Aurelio Vidmar

Participants

  Mike Wells
  George Dick OAM
  Donato Di Fabrizio
  John De Witt
  Peter Desira
  John Thomson

2009 inductees

Players

  Tony Vidmar 
  Cheryl Salisbury
  Paul Okon

Participants

  John Economos
  Sam Vella OA

2010 inductees

Players

  Ned Zelić
  Joanne Peters
  Stan Lazaridis

Participants

  Martyn Crook
  Mark Shield

2011 inductees

Players

  Craig Moore
  Dianne Alagich

Participants

  Ted Simmons
  Mike Cockerill

2012 inductees

Players

  Alison Forman
  Scott Chipperfield

Participants

  Alan Vessey

2013 inductees

Players

  James "Jim" Fraser
  Sunni Hughes

2014 inductees

Players

  Sandra Brentnall
  Damian Mori
  Mark Viduka

Participants

  Stefan Kamasz
  Tom Sermanni

2015 inductees

Players

  Lisa Casagrande
  John Kundereri Moriarty

2016 inductees

Players

  Sacha Wainwright
  Peter Raskopoulos

Participants

  Tammy Ogston

2018 inductees

Players

  Sonia Gegenhuber
  Mark Bresciano

Participants

  Andrew Dettre

2019 inductees

Players

  Harry Kewell
  Leigh Wardell

Participants

  Branko Culina
  Frank Lowy

2021 inductees

Players

  Heather Garriock
  Grace Gill
  Mark Schwarzer OAM

Participants

  Joe Honeysett

2022 inductees

Players

  Moya Dodd
  Collette McCallum
  Ange Postecoglou
  Ted Smith

Participants

  Walter Pless
  Brendan Schwab

See also
 Football Hall of Fame Western Australia

References

External links
Official website

Association football museums and halls of fame
Australian soccer trophies and awards
Halls of fame in Australia
Awards established in 1996
Australian sports trophies and awards
1999 establishments in Australia